Bull Creek is a stream in Christian and Taney counties in the Ozarks of southern Missouri.

The stream flows south and southwest through portions of the Mark Twain National Forest. As it enters Taney County the stream gradient lessens and it occupies a series of entrenched meanders. As it passes Walnut Shade the stream is bridged by US 160 and receives the flow of Bear Creek. It enters the White River and Lake Taneycomo just southwest of Rockaway Beach. At Walnut Shade, the creek has an average discharge of 224 cubic feet per second.

Source coordinates: ; confluence coordinants: .

According to tradition, Bull Creek was named for the fact the area was the hunting ground of buffalo bulls by pioneer citizens.

See also
List of rivers of Missouri

References

Rivers of Christian County, Missouri
Rivers of Taney County, Missouri
Rivers of Missouri